The 2022 Pepperdine Waves men's volleyball team represents Pepperdine University in the 2022 NCAA Division I & II men's volleyball season. The Waves, led by fifth year head coach David Hunt, play their home games at Firestone Fieldhouse. The Waves are members of the MPSF and were picked to win in the preseason poll.

Season highlights
Will be filled in as the season progresses.

Roster

Schedule
TV/Internet Streaming information:
All home games will be televised on WaveCasts. All road games will also be streamed by the schools tv or streaming service. The conference tournament will be streamed by FloVolleyball. 

 *-Indicates conference match. (#)-Indicates tournament seeding.
 Times listed are Pacific Time Zone.

Announcers for televised games

Erskine: Al Epstein
Erskine: Al Epstein
Princeton: Al Epstein
UC Santa Barbara: Al Epstein
Lewis: Al Epstein
UC Santa Barbara: Max Kelton & Katie Spieler
UC Irvine: Al Epstein
UC Irvine: Rob Espero & Charlie Brande
Grand Canyon: Diana Johnson & Houston Boe
Grand Canyon: Diana Johnson & Amanda Roach
USC: Al Epstein
USC: Anne Marie Anderson
McKendree: Colin Suhre
McKendree: Colin Suhre
George Mason: Al Epstein
CSUN: Al Epstein
CSUN: Darren  Preston
BYU: Al Epstein
BYU: Al Epstein
Concordia Irvine: Patience O'Neal
Concordia Irvine: Al Epstein
UCLA: Al Epstein
UCLA: Jim Watson
Stanford: Al Epstein
Stanford: Al Epstein
MPSF Quarterfinal- BYU: Nick Kopp
MPSF Semifinal- USC: Darren Preston
MPSF Championship- Stanford: Darren Preston

Rankings 

^The Media did not release a Pre-season poll.

References

2022 in sports in California
2022 NCAA Division I & II men's volleyball season
2022 Mountain Pacific Sports Federation volleyball season